James Arthur Temp (October 10, 1933 – November 25, 2012) was an American football player, businessman, and philanthropist.

Born in La Crosse, Wisconsin, Temp attended Aquinas High School in La Crosse. Temp then attended the University of Wisconsin–Madison, playing baseball and football. He was named the school's top athlete in his senior year (1955) and eventually inducted into the UW Athletic Hall of Fame (2007).

Temp was selected 17th in the second round of the 1955 NFL Draft by the Green Bay Packers, but served two years in the U.S. Army before joining the team in 1957 as a defensive end. He played 43 games with them over four seasons (1957–1960; the last two under Vince Lombardi) before being forced into retirement by a shoulder injury.

Temp joined the Green Bay Packers Board of Directors in 1987 and served as a member emeritus of the Executive Committee (1993–2004).

Temp was head of the UW-Green Bay Founders Association, whose purpose was development of a philanthropic base for University of Wisconsin–Green Bay (UWGB). He served as Association president in 1980 and 1981. In 1984, he joined Donald J. Long, Sr., to take on yet another challenge on behalf of UWGB, chairing the University's first capital campaign (raising more than $2.5 million). In gratitude, the school named the James A. Temp Hall (a student dormitory) after him in 1989.

In addition to his professional work as president of Alexander and Alexander of Wisconsin, an insurance brokerage), Temp served in many community leadership roles with business organizations, civic groups, and health agencies. He continued to work on behalf of UWGB as a director of the Founders Association and University Village Housing Inc.

Temp battled heart disease in his later years. On November 25, 2012, while watching football, he became ill and died later that day. He was 79 years old. He was survived by his wife, Carol Jean Temp, 4 daughters, 13 grandchildren, and a great-grandchild.

See also
 List of Green Bay Packers players

References

1933 births
2012 deaths
Sportspeople from La Crosse, Wisconsin
Players of American football from Wisconsin
American football defensive ends
Aquinas High School (La Crosse, Wisconsin) alumni
Wisconsin Badgers football players
Green Bay Packers players
United States Army soldiers
Military personnel from Wisconsin